Pareiorhaphis mutuca is a species of catfish in the family Loricariidae. It is native to South America, where it occurs in the headwaters of the Das Velhas River basin in Brazil, with its type locality being listed as near Nova Lima in the state of Minas Gerais. It is typically found in rocky areas, where it is known to hide under stones during the day. The species reaches 9.6 cm (3.8 inches) in standard length and is believed to be a facultative air-breather.

References 

Loricariidae
Fish described in 1999
Catfish of South America
Fish of Brazil